Parliamentary elections were held in Nigeria on 12 December 1959. The result was a victory for the Northern People's Congress, which won 134 of the 312 seats in the House of Representatives, despite the National Council of Nigeria and the Cameroons and Action Group receiving more votes. It formed a coalition with five other parties and two independents, holding a total of 148 seats. Voter turnout was 79.5%.

Results
The Northern People's Congress-led coalition, also consisting of the Mabolaje Grand Alliance, Igala Union, Igbira Tribal Union, Niger Delta Congress and affiliated independents won 148 seats. The National Council of Nigeria and the Cameroons-led coalition, also consisting of the Northern Elements Progressive Union won 89 seats, while the Action Group and affiliated independents won 75 seats.

See also
Ronald Wraith, British national, chairman of the Nigerian Federal Electoral Commission for the 1959 parliamentary and regional elections

References

Nigeria
General
Nigeria
Parliamentary elections in Nigeria
1959 elections
Election and referendum articles with incomplete results